The 1992 United States Senate election in Louisiana took place on November 3, 1992. Incumbent Democratic senator John Breaux won a majority in Louisiana's jungle primary on October 3, 1992, winning reelection to another term.

Major candidates

Democratic
 John Breaux, incumbent U.S. Senator
 Nick Joseph Accardo

Republican
 Lyle Stocksill
 Fred Clegg Strong

Independent
 Jon Khachaturian

Results

See also
 1992 United States Senate elections

References

Louisiana
1992
1992 Louisiana elections